Reimei (PLH-33) is a Reimei-class patrol vessel currently operated by the Japanese Coast Guard.

Design 

Reimei-class carries two 40 mm autocanon and two JM61 20 mm machine guns, as does the Akitsushima. Gun mounts of 40 mm autocanons are changed to Mk4, which is lighter than the Mk3 mounted on the Akitsushima. Both are capable of being remotely controlled with optical directors. 

Aviation facilities are also similar to that of Akitsushima, capable of carrying two EC225LP Super Puma helicopters: however, only one helicopter is normally carried on this vessel.

Construction and career 
Reimei was laid down on 7 June 2017 and launched on 8 March 2019 by Mitsubishi, Nagasaki. She was commissioned on 19 February 2020.

References

Bibliography
 
 
 

Shikishima-class patrol vessels
2019 ships
Ships built by Mitsubishi Heavy Industries